This is a list of British representatives in Muscat and Oman from 1800 to 1971. They were responsible for representing British interests in the Sultanate of Muscat and Oman while the country was a British protectorate (from 20 March 1891 until 2 December 1971). Muscat and Oman was reconstituted as the modern-day Sultanate of Oman after the protectorate ended.

For British representatives in Oman since 1971, see: List of ambassadors of the United Kingdom to Oman.

List

(Dates in italics indicate de facto continuation of office)

See also

History of Oman
Foreign relations of Oman

External links

British representatives
History of Oman
Trucial States
Oman–United Kingdom relations